Miami Springs is a city in Miami-Dade County, Florida, United States. The city was founded by Glenn Hammond Curtiss, "The Father of Naval Aviation", and James Bright, during the famous "land boom" of the 1920s and was originally named "Country Club Estates". It, along with other cities in Miami-Dade County such as Coral Gables and Opa-locka, formed some of the first planned communities in the state. Like its counterparts, the city had an intended theme which in its case, was to reflect a particular architecture and ambiance.

In this case it was a regional style of architecture called Pueblo Revival developed in the American Southwest, primarily New Mexico, and incorporating design elements of pueblo architecture. Other buildings incorporated Mission-style design. In fact, the original Hotel Country Club was designed to resemble a pueblo village.

Shortly prior to incorporation in 1926, the city was renamed after a spring located in the area which provided parts of Miami with fresh water until the mid-1990s. As of 2020, the population recorded by the U.S. Census Bureau was 13,859.

Geography
It is bordered to the northeast by the city of Hialeah and to the southwest by the village of Virginia Gardens. U.S. Route 27 runs parallel to the Miami Springs/Hialeah border. It leads east  to its southern terminus at U.S. Route 1 in Wynwood, Miami, and northwest  to Hialeah Gardens. To the south Miami Springs is bordered by Miami International Airport.

The core of Miami Springs (excluding the more recently annexed areas) is roughly shaped as a triangle with three definable sides. Northwest 36th Street forms most of the southern boundary, while the Miami River canal forms the northern/eastern boundary. Finally, the Ludlam Canal and Florida East Coast Railroad Yard delimit the western boundary.

Surrounding areas
  Hialeah
   Medley    Miami
 Unincorporated Miami-Dade County, Virginia Gardens     Hialeah, Miami, Unincorporated Miami-Dade County
  Unincorporated Miami-Dade County    Unincorporated Miami-Dade County
  Virginia Gardens, Miami International Airport

Demographics

2020 census

As of the 2020 United States census, there were 13,859 people, 4,879 households, and 3,413 families residing in the city.

2010 census

As of 2010, there were 5,361 households, out of which 5.6% were vacant. In 2000, 33.6% had children under the age of 18 living with them, 52.0% were married couples living together, 12.2% had a female householder with no husband present, and 30.9% were non-families. 24.8% of all households were made up of individuals, and 8.2% had someone living alone who was 65 years of age or older. The average household size was 2.64 and the average family size was 3.16.

2000 census
In 2000, the city population was spread out, with 22.9% under the age of 18, 7.2% from 18 to 24, 31.2% from 25 to 44, 23.2% from 45 to 64, and 15.5% who were 65 years of age or older. The median age was 39 years. For every 100 females, there were 92.5 males. For every 100 females age 18 and over, there were 88.6 males.

In 2000, the median income for a household in the city was $50,000, and the median income for a family was $56,892. Males had a median income of $37,176 versus $30,823 for females. The per capita income for the city was $22,963. About 6.9% of families and 9.7% of the population were below the poverty line, including 9.8% of those under age 18 and 8.6% of those age 65 or over.

As of 2000, speakers of Spanish as a first language made up 63.21% of residents, and English accounted for 35.49% of the population. Other languages spoken as the main language were well below 1.00%.

History

Miami Springs was founded by an aviation pioneer, and thus, the fate of the city has always been intertwined with the aviation industry, particularly since Miami International Airport (MIA) is located just south of the city on the southern border of NW 36th Street. The airline industry brought many residents from airline crew bases, as well as employment opportunities at the airport, which brought much prosperity to the city. This dependence, however, left the city vulnerable. The sudden 1991 collapses of both Eastern Airlines and Pan American World Airways left many Miami Springs residents unemployed and unable to afford living in the neighborhood. Given that the businesses in Miami Springs had always relied upon the large disposable incomes of the employees of the large airline carriers, the bankruptcy of both corporations in the same year created a chain reaction, eventually causing many small businesses to close their doors. Despite the closure of the airlines, from a residential standpoint, Miami Springs remained strong. The city is often seen as blessedly isolated from the perceived turbulence of the rest of Miami-Dade County. This has continued to provide ample replacements for the older residents who are lost over time. Nonetheless the legacy of the airline closures remains. Residential millage taxation rates hover near the state mandated maximum.

Economy
The Consulate-General of Bolivia in Miami is located in Suite 505 at 700 South Royal Poinciana Boulevard in Miami Springs.

Significant historical landmarks

Curtiss Mansion is a Pueblo style home that belonged to city founder Glenn Curtiss. Beginning in the late 1970s, the house was subject to vandalism and a number of fires. In 1998, a public/private partnership of Curtiss Mansion, Inc., and the city of Miami Springs embarked on a lengthy restoration project, completed in 2012.

Fair Haven Nursing Home is one of the oldest buildings in Miami Springs and is built in the pueblo style favored during the initial development. The building was designed by architect Bernard E. Muller. It was designated a Miami Springs Historic Site  in 1984.

A simple timeline of events:
1926 - Country Club Estates incorporated
1927 - Hotel Country Club officially opened
1930 - Miami-Battle Creek Sanitarium opened
1942 - Sanitarium leased to US Army
1945 - Sanitarium reopens
1959 - Miami-Battle Creek Sanitarium becomes The Palm Spa
1962 - Present - Fair Havens Center

Before becoming a nursing home, the building served as the Hotel Country Club. The hotel was built by Glenn Curtiss and partners, and was intended to promote the development of the then-new Country Club Estates. It was furnished in a Southwestern style, with Navajo rugs on the floor and handcrafted solid mahogany furniture. In 1929, after the crash, Curtiss sold the hotel to his friend John Harvey Kellogg, who renamed it the "Miami Battle Creek Sanitarium" and operated for many years. During World War II, it served the Air Transport Command as a hospital for recuperating military personnel. Later it became a home for the elderly, which it still is today.

A 'Virtual Tour of Historic Miami Springs' can be done on the City of Miami Springs website: https://www.miamisprings-fl.gov/tour

Education

The city of Miami Springs is served by a sizeable number of public and private educational institutions.

The city is part of the Miami-Dade County Public Schools System (M-DCPS), and all public schools under this system follow guidelines set forth by the Florida Department of Education. Miami Springs is served publicly by:
 Miami Springs Senior High School
 Miami Springs Middle School
 Miami Springs Elementary School
 Springview Elementary School

Two charter schools serve Miami Springs:
 Glenn Curtiss Elementary AIE Charter School (Academy for International Education) provides K–8 education.
 ISAAC Academy (Integrated Science and Asian Culture) provides K–8 education.

Private schools in Miami Springs are largely provided by local religious institutions: 
 All Angels Episcopal Church operates All Angels Academy for children of a similar age group.
 Blessed Trinity Catholic School of the Roman Catholic Archdiocese of Miami is located in nearby Virginia Gardens,) and provides K–8 education. 
 Grace Lutheran Church operates Grace Lutheran Learning Center for children of a similar age group.

References

External links
 
 MiamiSprings.com Community site
 SpringyLeaks Miami Springs news

Cities in Miami-Dade County, Florida
Planned cities in the United States
Cities in Florida
Planned communities in Florida
Cities in Miami metropolitan area